The Cloud Peak Wilderness is located in north central Wyoming in the United States. Entirely within Bighorn National Forest, the wilderness was established in 1984 in an effort to preserve the wildest section of the Bighorn Mountains. The wilderness has the highest peaks in the Bighorn Mountains including Cloud Peak and Black Tooth Mountain, as well as Cloud Peak Glacier, the only remaining active glacier in the Bighorn Mountains.

U.S. Wilderness Areas do not allow motorized or mechanized vehicles, including bicycles. Although camping and fishing are allowed with proper permit, no roads or buildings are constructed and there is also no logging or mining, in compliance with the 1964 Wilderness Act. Wilderness areas within National Forests and Bureau of Land Management areas also allow hunting in season.

Climate

See also
 List of U.S. Wilderness Areas

References

External links
 
 
 

Protected areas of Big Horn County, Wyoming
IUCN Category Ib
Protected areas of Johnson County, Wyoming
Protected areas of Sheridan County, Wyoming
Wilderness areas of Wyoming
Bighorn National Forest
Protected areas established in 1984
1984 establishments in Wyoming